Bolle may refer to:

People
 Eivind Bolle (born 1923), Norwegian politician for the Labour Party
 Frank Bolle (born 1924), American cartoonist
  (1905–1999), whose standard abbreviation as a botanist is "F. Bolle"
 Pierette Cornelie Bolle (1893–1945), whose standard abbreviation as a botanist is "P. C. Bolle"; see 
 Roberto Bolle (born 1975), Italian ballet dancer

Other uses
 Bolle's pigeon, named after the naturalist Carl Bolle
 , a defunct German supermarket chain; see 
 , a defunct German dairy

See also
 Carl Bolle (disambiguation)
 Karl Bolle (disambiguation)
 Bollé (disambiguation)